Derek Gow is a UK-based reintroduction expert, farmer and author known for his work with watervoles, beavers, white storks and wildcats.

He also imported the first Heck cattle to the UK. However, after aggressive behaviour could harm or even kill handlers, a significant proportion of the herd was culled.

Gow owns a farm in Lifton, Devon, which is home to captive breeding facilities, accommodation and a working farm. Much of the land is under the process of rewilding, alike to the Knepp Estate. The farm is home to many species, including Eurasian lynx, wild boar, beavers, white storks and harvest mice. Gow has helped to setup Celtic Reptile & Amphibian.

References

Living people
Animal reintroduction
English biologists
21st-century British biologists
Conservation biologists
Year of birth missing (living people)